Gullstrand is a lunar impact crater that lies on the northern hemisphere on the Moon's far side. About one crater diameter to the southeast is the larger crater Perrine. To the west-southwest is Quetelet.

This crater has a circular rim that is relatively well-defined, and has only been moderately worn. A small, bell-shaped crater forms a break through the rim to the southwest, and a small craterlet is attached to the southeastern side along the rim of Gullstrand. An oddly shaped small crater feature is attached to the eastern edge. There are also tiny craters along the rim of Gullstrand along the northern and southern edges.

The inner walls of Gullstrand are relatively simple and featureless, and the interior floor is not marked by any craters of note. There is a low central ridge at the midpoint.

Gullstrand lies at the approximate margin of the Coulomb-Sarton Basin, a 530 km wide impact crater of Pre-Nectarian age.

Satellite craters
By convention these features are identified on lunar maps by placing the letter on the side of the crater midpoint that is closest to Gullstrand.

References

 
 
 
 
 
 
 
 
 
 
 
 

Impact craters on the Moon